The Brush Hill Historic District is a residential historic district along Brush Hill Road in Milton, Massachusetts.  It extends on the north side of the road from Dana Avenue to Brush Hill Lane, and on the south side from Bradlee Road to Robbins Street.  Shortly before settlers migrated to Brush Hill in the 1650s, a significant forest fire struck the area causing trees to die and leaves to fall. When the settlers arrived, the hill was covered in brush, hence the name. The district includes a representative cross-section of residential development from c. 1670 to the late 1940s, and includes Milton's oldest house, the Robert Tucker House, at 678 Brush Hill Road. Brush Hill is one of the three main hills of Milton; Milton Hill, Brush Hill, and the Blue Hills.

The district was listed on the National Register of Historic Places in 1998.

See also
National Register of Historic Places listings in Milton, Massachusetts

References

Historic districts in Norfolk County, Massachusetts
Federal architecture in Massachusetts
Milton, Massachusetts
National Register of Historic Places in Milton, Massachusetts
Historic districts on the National Register of Historic Places in Massachusetts